The 2021 Wisconsin Spring Election was held in the U.S. state of Wisconsin on April 6, 2021. There was one statewide race—for Superintendent of Public Instruction.  Additionally, two special elections occurred for the Wisconsin State Senate and Wisconsin State Assembly, as well as other nonpartisan local and judicial elections. The 2021 Spring primary was held on February 16, 2021.

An additional special election for the 37th Assembly district was held on July 13, 2021.

In the election for Superintendent of Public Instruction, the Democrats' preferred candidate, Jill Underly, prevailed.  Republicans, however, won both special elections for the Wisconsin Legislature, and Republicans' preferred candidates won both contested elections for the Wisconsin Court of Appeals.

State elections

Executive

Superintendent of Public Instruction
Incumbent Superintendent of Public Instruction Carolyn Stanford Taylor did not seek election to a full term.  She was appointed to the seat by Governor Tony Evers, the previous Superintendent of Public Instruction, to fill the remainder of his term after he was elected Governor of Wisconsin in 2018.

Eight candidates filed petitions by the state deadline to run for election to this seat, of which, seven were approved.  The office is nonpartisan, thus all accepted candidates appeared on the primary ballot on February 16, 2021.

 Sheila Briggs, assistant state superintendent at the state Department of Public Instruction.
 Joe Fenrick, Fond du Lac high school science teacher.
 Troy Gunderson, Viterbo University professor and former superintendent of the School District of West Salem.
 Shandowlyon (Shawn) Hendricks-Williams, former director of Evers' Milwaukee office and DPI Education Administrative Director of Teacher Education, Professional Development and Licensing.
 Deborah Kerr, former superintendent of Brown Deer School District.
 Steve Krull, principal of Milwaukee's Garland Elementary School and former Air Force instructor.
 Jill Underly, superintendent of Pecatonica School District.

Jill Underly and Deborah Kerr won the most votes in the top-two primary, and advanced to the April 6 general election, which Underly won with 58% of the vote.

| colspan="6" style="text-align:center;background-color: #e9e9e9;"| Nonpartisan Primary, February 16, 2021

| colspan="6" style="text-align:center;background-color: #e9e9e9;"| General Election, April 6, 2021

Legislative

State Senate 13th district special election
A special election was held concurrent with the spring primary and spring general to fill the 13th State Senate seat vacated by the resignation of Scott L. Fitzgerald.

Seven candidates filed petitions by the state deadline to run for election to this seat, of which six were approved, including three Republicans, one Democrat, and two independents.  State Representative John Jagler won the Republican primary and went on to win the April special election with 51% of the vote.

State Assembly 89th district special election
A special election was held concurrent with the spring primary and spring general to fill the 89th State Assembly seat vacated by the resignation of John Nygren.

Five candidates filed petitions by the state deadline to run for election to this seat, all were approved, including four Republicans and one Democrat.  Elijah Behnke won the Republican primary and went on to win the special election with 63% of the vote.

State Assembly 37th district special election
A special election was held on July 13, 2021, to fill the 37th State Assembly seat vacated by the resignation of John Jagler.

Ten candidates filed petitions by the state deadline to run for this seat, all were approved, including eight Republicans, one Democrat, and one Independent.  William Penterman won the June 15 Republican primary and went on to win the special election with 54% of the vote.

Judicial

State Court of Appeals
Three seats on the Wisconsin Court of Appeals were up for election in 2021, two of which were contested.  Incumbent Judge Jeffrey O. Davis was defeated.
 Judge Maxine Aldridge White, appointed by Governor Tony Evers in 2020, was unopposed seeking re-election in District I.
 In District II, Judge Jeffrey O. Davis, appointed by Governor Tony Evers in 2019, was defeated by municipal judge Shelley Grogan of Muskego.
 In District III, Wisconsin circuit court judge Gregory B. Gill, Jr., of Outagamie County, defeated attorney Rick Cveykus of Wausau, to succeed retiring Judge Mark Seidl.

State Circuit Courts
Sixty three of the state's 253 circuit court seats were up for election in 2021.  Eleven of those seats were contested.  Three of the contested seats, in Calumet, Jackson, and Marathon counties, were newly created from a 2020 act of the Wisconsin Legislature.  A fourth newly created seat, in Dunn County, had only one candidate running.

 In Bayfield County, incumbent Judge John P. Anderson defeated a challenge from attorney Vincent Scott Kurta.
 In Brown County, incumbent Judge Kendall M. Kelley defeated a challenge from attorney Rachel Maes.
 In Calumet County, attorney Carey John Reed defeated Calumet County corporation counsel Kimberly A. Tenerelli for a newly created judicial seat.
 In Dunn County, attorney Christina Mayer defeated attorney Nicholas P. Lange for the judicial seat being vacated by Judge Rod W. Smeltzer.
 In Fond du Lac County, former Green Lake County district attorney Andrew J. Christenson defeated attorney Laura Lavey to succeed outgoing judge Richard J. Nuss.  Former Fond du Lac city councilmember Catherine A. Block and attorney Dawn M. Sabel were eliminated in the February primary.
 In Green County, attorney Faun Marie Phillipson defeated attorney Jane Bucher to succeed outgoing judge Jim Beer. Attorneys Peter B. Kelly and Daniel R. Bartholf were eliminated in the February primary.
 In Jackson County, attorneys Daniel Diehn and Robyn R. Matousek will compete for a newly created judicial seat.
 In Kenosha County Branch 1, incumbent Judge Larisa Benitez-Morgan was apparently defeated by former Racine County prosecutor Gerad Dougvillo.
 In Kenosha County Branch 6, deputy district attorney Angelina Gabriele defeated attorney Angela Cunningham to succeed outgoing judge Mary K. Wagner.  Attorney Elizabeth Pfeuffer was eliminated in the February primary.
 In Marathon County, Marathon County corporation counsel Scott M. Corbett defeated attorney Daniel T. Cveykus for a newly created judicial seat.
 In Milwaukee County, assistant public defender Katie Kegel defeated attorney Susan Roth to replace outgoing judge Clare Fiorenza.

Local elections

Dane County
 Incumbent Joe Parisi was re-elected to a third full term as County Executive, he defeated challenger Mary Ann Nicholson with 79% of the vote.

Sheboygan
 Incumbent mayor Mike Vandersteen was defeated by 27-year-old city council president Ryan Sorenson, who was elected as the city's youngest mayor.
 Three members of the Sheboygan Area School District's board were also elected.

Waupaca County

 Three seats will be up for election on the Clintonville School Board. Eight candidates entered the primary, which narrowed the field to six. The six candidates advancing are Larry Czarnecki, Chadwick J. Dobbe, Glen Lundt, Laurie A. Vollrath, Jason L. Moder, and Ben Huber.
 Manawa's primary narrowed the field of mayoral candidates from 3 to two, with Mark Zelmer and Michael Frazier advancing.

References

External links
 Wisconsin Elections Commission

 
Wisconsin